Callicore hesperis, the hesperis eighty-eight or hesperis numberwing, is a species of butterfly of the family Nymphalidae. It is found in Colombia, Brazil, Ecuador, Peru, and Bolivia.

The wingspan is about 45 mm. The upperside of the forewings is black, with a broad diagonal red stripe. The upperside of the hindwings is dark brown with a brilliant metallic-blue sheen.

References

Biblidinae
Lepidoptera of Brazil
Nymphalidae of South America
Butterflies described in 1844